Terry and Lander Halls are two student residence halls of the University of Washington.  They have occupied various buildings over the years, have always been residence halls and always next to each other until the current construction which has Maple Hall between them.

The set of buildings was named for Charles and Mary Terry and Judge Edward Lander, who contributed part of the land for the original Territorial University's  Seattle campus in 1861.

History
The original Lander Hall was built in 1917 as the Aviation Dormitory for the U.S. Naval Training Camp, known as USNTC Building #39. After 1919 it served as the Men's Dormitory until it was torn down in 1928. It was designed by the Bremerton Navy Yard and was located southwest of the stadium along Montlake Boulevard. The original Terry Hall was built as the Naval Officers Dormitory in 1917 and known as USNTC Building #40. After the war it became the Men's Dormitory. It was located southwest of the stadium next to Lander Hall (#056). Also designed by the Bremerton Naval Yard, it was torn down in 1928.

From the 1950s to the 2012-2014, Terry and Lander Halls were two connected towers on the west campus of the University of Washington in Seattle, sharing common facilities on the bottom two floors.  Their addresses were 1101 and 1201 NE Campus Parkway, respectively.

The ground floor of Lander Hall contained some of the central offices of the Department of Housing and Food Services.

Architects for both towers were the firm of Young, Richardson, Carleton and Deltie. Unit 1, completed in 1953, was called Terry Hall and Unit 2, completed in 1957, was called Lander Hall.

This Lander Hall was demolished in 2012 and replaced with a new standalone building 
on the site, while its connected Terry Hall was demolished in 2014 and replaced by a new standalone building on the site along with an additional residence hall named Maple Hall between Terry and Lander.

Programming
Lander Hall is the home to the First Year Experience, Residential FIG and Honors Communities. Terry Hall is home to the Pre-Health Sciences Community.

References

External links
 Plans for the Lander Building Replacement, 2011

University of Washington campus
Demolished buildings and structures in Washington (state)